The 2003–04 Ohio Bobcats men's basketball team represented Ohio University in the college basketball season of 2003–04. The team was coached by Tim O'Shea and played their home games at the Convocation Center. They finished the season 10–20 and 7–11 in MAC play to finish last in the MAC East.

Roster

Preseason
The preseason poll was announced by the league office on October 23, 2003.

Preseason men's basketball poll
Northern Illinois was picked by the media to win the West Division while Miami was tabbed as the favorite in the East.

Schedule and results
Source: 

|-
!colspan=9 style=| Regular Season

|-
!colspan=9 style=| MAC Tournament

|-

Statistics

Team Statistics																																																					
Final 2003–04 Statistics																																																					
																																																					
																																																					
Source

Player statistics

Source

Awards and honors

All-MAC Awards 

Source

References

Ohio Bobcats men's basketball seasons
Ohio
Bob
Bob